Bahla Fort is one of four historic fortresses situated at the foot of the Jebel Akhdar highlands in Oman and the country's only UNESCO-listed fort added in 1987.

The fort underwent massive restoration efforts and reopened in 2012. However, the complex lacks in visitor information. There are no exhibits or brochures available to learn more about this large space or guides at hand to provide further details, so people either need to go on a tour or explore on their own.

History of Bahla Fort

The fort is believed to have been built between the 12th and 15th century by the Banu Nebhan tribe who inhabited the area at the time and were known for controlling the trade of frankincense at the time.

As part of the complex, there is also a citadel oasis adjacent to the fort and an ancient wall spanning 13 kilometres part of which are still standing. The majority of the oasis is in ruins but the structure and some of the houses still stand.

As the fort was built with bricks made of mud and straw, erosion damaged the structure until rehabilitation efforts were launched. There are a lot of legends surrounding the castle.

Structure of Bahla Fort 
There are three main parts inside the fort. The oldest part of the fort is Al-Qasabah. Bait al-Hadith, or new house, was built by the Ya’riba dynasty (1624-1743). Bait Al-Jabal was erected in the 18th century.

Risks to the Fort 

 The unfired brick is likely to decay
 Drainage is bad
 Modern materials are used on the rebuilding of the souk

Previous restorations 
Preservation attempt in 1995 was found to be a renovation not a restoration because the aim of the remodeling was to make the fort look new. This renovation began without prior archaeological, topographic, architectural or technical surveys.

Original building was mud-brick and mortar and plaster. Restoration unjustifiably used stone and cement to cover the walls so severely that the original walls couldn't be seen at all 

Irrigation is an issue, as there have not been any recent efforts to conserve this system. Parts of the ancient wall surrounding the fort have been destroyed or altered because of nearby building construction.

References

External links
 WHC UNESCO official site
 Video of Bahla Fort

Bahla
Forts in Oman
World Heritage Sites in Oman
Archaeological sites in Oman
Arabic architecture
World Heritage Sites in Danger